Laura Emonts, née Weihenmaier (born 4 April 1991) is a German volleyball player. She is a member of the Germany women's national volleyball team. She was part of the German national team at the 2014 FIVB Volleyball Women's World Championship in Italy.

Sporting achievements

National Team
 2009  Women's U20 World Championship (Tijuana & Mexicali, Mexico)
 2014  Women's European League
 2015 5th place Women's European Championship

Clubs

National championships
 2014/2015  German Championship, with Schweriner SC
 2016/2017  Czech Championship, with VK Prostějov
 2017/2018  Czech Championship, with VK Prostějov
 2018/2019  Hellenic Championship, with Olympiacos Piraeus

National cups
 2016/2017  Czech Cup, with VK Prostějov
 2017/2018  Czech Cup, with VK Prostějov
 2018/2019  Hellenic Cup, with Olympiacos Piraeus

Individuals
 2016-17 Czech Championship M.V.P., with VK Prostějov

References

External links
 Profile at FIVB
 Profile at CEV
 2009 Women's U20 World Championship at www.fivb.org
 Laura Weihenmaier at German national team on 2017 at www.cev.eu
 2014 CEV Volleyball European League - Women at www.cev.eu
 2017 CEV Volleyball European Championship - Women at www.cev.eu

1991 births
Living people
German women's volleyball players
People from Tuttlingen
Sportspeople from Freiburg (region)
European Games competitors for Germany
Volleyball players at the 2015 European Games
Olympiacos Women's Volleyball players
Expatriate volleyball players in Greece
German expatriates in Greece